London Irish Amateur Rugby Football Club, also known as London Irish Wild Geese, is an amateur English rugby union club based in Sunbury-on-Thames, Surrey, who play their rugby in Regional 2 Thames– a league at tier 6 of the English rugby union system – following their relegation from London & South East Premier at the end of the 2019–20 season. They are the amateur team of London Irish and play at Hazelwood.

History

The creation of London Irish Amateur was first discussed in 1995 when rugby union became professional and London Irish set aside resources for the creation of an amateur team. The club was founded in September 1999 after London Irish left The Avenue to play at the Twickenham Stoop before moving to Madejski Stadium in  Reading the following year. It was formed to be the feeder club for senior and junior amateur players to then go on to play for London Irish, who until the end of the 2015–16 season played in the English Premiership. A few players such as Adrian Flavin, Tom Smallbone, Paul Burke, Kevin Barret, Justin Bishop and Kieran Campbell went on to play international rugby.

London Irish and London Irish Amateur jointly share the new Hazelwood rugby complex. Since 2012, links between London Irish and London Irish Amateur have been upgraded with the two becoming part of a joint venture in which London Irish Amateur players play for London Irish in the A League. In return, members of London Irish's Academy are entitled to play for London Irish Amateur.

The first team's official name was changed to London Irish Wild Geese after the Rugby Football Union's governance committee gave consent for the change of name. In 2011, they were promoted from London 1 into National League 3 London & SE. In 2012, they were moved into National League 3 South West,. In 2013, they were promoted into National League 2 South.

London Irish Amateur receives a grant from the Irish Government's Emigrant Support Programme to support Mini Rugby.

London Irish Ladies 
London Irish Amateur Emeralds were formed in 2015  and completed in their first fixtures in season 2016 to 2017. In season 2017 to 2018 they competed in Women's NC South East West 3 and were promoted.

London Irish Ladies currently compete in the Women's Championship South 1 with home fixtures played at Hazelwood (Rugby Ground).

Mini & Youth Rugby 
London Irish Amateur have both mini(school year reception to 6) and youth sections (school year 7 to 12) based at Hazelwood (Rugby Ground). Mini Rugby is the game for all players, male and female who play together. Youth Rugby is a game for boys and girls aged 12 – 17 who play in gender based teams.

The club hold an annual International Mini and U12 Festival each year which is frequented by teams from the home nations and Europe.

Honours
 Surrey 1 champions: 2001–02
 London 2 (south-east v south-west) promotion play-off winner: 2005–06
 London Division 2 South West champions: 2009–10
 Surrey Trophy winners (2): 2010, 2011
 London 1 (north v south) promotion play-off winner: 2010–11
 National League 3 South-West champions: 2012–13
 Surrey Cup winners: 2013
 National League 3 London & SE champions: 2015–16
 Women's NC South East Middle 2 champions: 2018-2019
 Women's Championship South West 2 champions: 2021-2022

Coaching staff
 Chair of Men's Rugby: Joe Byrne 
 Manager: Trevor Johnson 
 Head Coach: Ryan Gregory 
 Forwards Coach: Matthew Cornish
 Defence Coach: Hugh O'Sullivan
 Attack and Skills: Paddy Jackson
 Strength and Conditioning: Willie Lafolafo

See also
 London Irish
 Hazelwood (Rugby Ground)

References

External links
 Official Site 

English rugby union teams
London Irish
Rugby union clubs in Surrey
Rugby clubs established in 1999
Irish diaspora sports clubs in the United Kingdom
1999 establishments in England
Rugby union clubs in London
Sunbury-on-Thames
Sport in the London Borough of Hounslow